Gurney Halleck is a fictional character in the Dune universe created by Frank Herbert. He is a major character in Herbert's Dune (1965) and Children of Dune (1976), as a lover of the widowed Lady Jessica, also appearing in some of the prequel/sequel novels by Brian Herbert and Kevin J. Anderson.

Gurney is portrayed by Patrick Stewart in the 1984 David Lynch film Dune. P. H. Moriarty plays the role in the 2000 Sci-Fi Channel TV miniseries Frank Herbert's Dune and its 2003 sequel, Frank Herbert's Children of Dune. The character is portrayed by Josh Brolin in the 2021 Denis Villeneuve film Dune and its 2023 sequel Dune: Part Two.

Characteristics
Halleck is a talented minstrel skilled in the use of the baliset. His jawline bears a scar from an inkvine whip wound inflicted by Glossu Rabban in the Harkonnen slave pits. A loyal friend to Duke Leto Atreides and his concubine Lady Jessica, many years after Leto's death it is suggested in Children of Dune that Gurney and Jessica have become lovers. Leto's son Paul Atreides refers to him as "Gurney the valorous" in Dune, and Duke Leto comments that Paul has named Gurney well.

Appearances

Dune novels
Halleck is Paul's weapons teacher, as well as a skilled musician. He is one of Leto's chief officers, and serves alongside Duncan Idaho as a Swordmaster of House Atreides. According to Dune, Gurney was trained by "the best fighters in the universe", and alongside Idaho and Thufir Hawat gave Leto a war council almost unparalleled in the Imperium. He manages to survive the fall of House Atreides on Arrakis with 73 men. In the years after the attack, he falls in with the melange smugglers, eventually becoming a powerful figure. His smugglers fall for a Fremen trap—a fake hoard of spice—and are almost killed before Paul, now the Fremen leader "Muad'Dib", recognizes him. Halleck later becomes Jessica's loyal chief officer after nearly killing her, mistakenly believing she betrayed Duke Leto. In the later novels it is implied that the two become lovers, although this is never confirmed.

In Children of Dune, Gurney returns to Arrakis with Jessica from Caladan. He coordinates a purging of dissidents along with Fremen leader Stilgar, an operation that he kept secret. He goes to the sietch Jacurutu under what he believes are Jessica's orders to test that Paul's son Leto II has not fallen to Abomination. When the Fremen Namri reveals that the testing was ordered by Alia, he kills the man and escapes, sending a message to Duncan to set off the course of events that will force Stilgar to act. He takes temporary shelter with a new batch of smugglers before stealing an ornithopter. With it, he escapes to a rebel sietch, where Leto II and The Preacher arrive. Leto II takes him to Shuloch. After Leto II returns to Arrakeen and takes the throne, Gurney is assigned to Sietch Tabr as part of Stilgar's council.

Prequels and sequels
Gurney's character is further explored in the Prelude to Dune prequels (1999–2001) written by Brian Herbert, Frank Herbert's son, and Kevin J. Anderson.

According to the prequels, Gurney Halleck was born on Giedi Prime, the homeworld of House Harkonnen. After an incident with the local militia and the murder of his sister, he escaped Giedi Prime and aligned himself with the rogue House Vernius. Eventually, after a string of conflicts and the death of Earl Dominic Vernius, Gurney Halleck arrived at the Atreides homeworld of Caladan seeking the exiled Prince Rhombur Vernius. After helping reclaim the planet Ix for House Vernius, Halleck served House Atreides, eventually becoming Paul Atreides' weapons teacher.

In Chapterhouse: Dune (1985) it is revealed that the Tleilaxu Master Scytale possesses a hidden nullentropy capsule containing cells carefully and secretly collected by the Tleilaxu for millennia, including the cells of Paul Atreides, Duke Leto, Jessica, and Gurney. A ghola of Gurney is "conceived" in Sandworms of Dune (2007), a sequel to the original Frank Herbert series written by Brian Herbert and Kevin J. Anderson, but is killed during gestation in an act of sabotage.

In adaptations
Gurney is portrayed by Patrick Stewart in the 1984 David Lynch film Dune. P. H. Moriarty plays the role in the 2000 Sci-Fi Channel TV miniseries Frank Herbert's Dune and its 2003 sequel, Frank Herbert's Children of Dune. The character is portrayed by Josh Brolin in the 2021 Denis Villeneuve film Dune, who will reprise the role in the 2023 sequel Dune: Part Two.

Merchandising
A line of Dune action figures from toy company LJN was released to lackluster sales in 1984. Styled after David Lynch's film, the collection featured figures of various characters. A figure of Gurney previewed in LJN's catalog was never produced.

Family tree

Notes

References

Halleck, Gurney
Fictional martial arts trainers
Fictional string musicians
Fictional swordfighters
Literary characters introduced in 1965
Male characters in literature